See also Llanfihangel (disambiguation).

Llanfihangel-y-Pennant is a small village in Gwynedd, Wales.  It is in the community of Dolbenmaen in Snowdonia.

It is named after Cwm Pennant, a valley which stretches from north of the villages of Dolbenmaen and Golan towards the Drwys y Coed pass, between Moel Hebog and Crib Nantlle.

The parish church is dedicated to Saint Michael, Llanfihangel being the Welsh for the church of St. Michael's. It is a grade II* listed building. The ancient ecclesiastical parish of Llanfihangel-y-Pennant is part of the bishopric of Bangor.

References

External links

www.geograph.co.uk : photos of Llanfihangel-y-Pennant, Cwm Pennant and surrounding area

Villages in Gwynedd
Villages in Snowdonia
Dolbenmaen